Zanesville High School is a public high school in Zanesville, Ohio.  Zanesville High School is the only public high school in the Zanesville City School District.

History
The first Zanesville High School was built in downtown North 6th Street 1849 and opened its doors in 1855. In 1908, a new Zanesville High School was built across the street and named Lash High School in honor of Superintendent William D. Lash.
The fourth version, was opened on September 9, 1954, on Blue Ave. This land was willed by John McIntire for public park/education.  At the time of its opening, the Times Recorder said of the $4 million school, "you have to see it to believe it.".  Old Lash High became Hancock Jr High until it was demolished in the early 1980s. 
From 1908 until 1988, ZHS housed grades 10–12, now ZHS houses grades 9–12.  The fifth Zanesville High School opened its doors on Tuesday, September 7, 2010, built on the same land as the old ZHS on Blue Ave.

Student/teacher population
Zanesville High School contains over 800 students in grades 9–12.

It has a student/teacher ratio of 18 and 97% of its teachers are fully certified.

The student body is 78% White/Non-Hispanic, 18% Black/Non-Hispanic and 3% multiracial with 1% unspecified.

Clubs and activities
Clubs and activities include: Robotics Club, National Honor Society, Key Club, Comus, Drama Club, Foreign Language Club, Quiz Team, Japanese Anime & Culture Club (JACC), Fellowship of Christian Students, eSports, the Table-Top Gaming Club, Ski Club and S.A.D.D. Club.
The Latin Club is now defunct. It once functioned as a local chapter of both the Ohio Junior Classical League (OJCL) and National Junior Classical League (NJCL).

Athletics
As members of the Ohio High School Athletic Association, the Zanesville Blue Devils sport 14 varsity teams. Most Blue Devil squads compete in Division II, although a few compete in Division I.  Zanesville competes in the Licking County League.
ZHS sports teams in the following sports:
Baseball (Boys), 
Basketball (Boys and Girls), 
Cheerleading, 
Cross Country, 
Football, 
Golf, 
Marching Band, 
Soccer (Boys and Girls), 
Softball (Girls), 
Swimming, 
Tennis (Boys and Girls), 
Track, 
Volleyball (Girls)
Wrestling

Ohio High School Athletic Association State Championships

 Boys' Basketball – 1926, 1955, 1995 
 The 1995 Zanesville boys' basketball team finished its state championship run with a 26–0 record. As of the 2015–16 season, the Blue Devils are the only Division I team in state history to finish with an unbeaten record. Prior to ZHS, the last team in Ohio's largest class/division to finish undefeated was Akron Central-Hower, which finished 28–0 to claim the Class AAA state title in 1980.
 Track and Field
 John Simpson, 1968: Shot Put - 60' 7-3/4" 
 Jon Thomas, 1980: 300 meter Low hurdles - :36.8 
 Jon Thomas, 1981: 110 meter hurdles - :14.18 
 Jon Thomas, 1981: 300 meter Low hurdles - :36.45 
 Ira Wentworth, 1988: 3200 meter - 9:19.46 
 Ira Wentworth, 1989: 3200 meter - 9:14.24 
 Erika Goines, 1993: Shot Put - 44' 10-3/4" 
 Erika Goines, 1994: Shot Put - 44' 11" 
 Boys' Tennis
 Mark Mees, 1978 & 1979 
 Ty Tucker, 1985

Football
The Zanesville football team is the alma mater of Buster Howe, the state's first Mr. Football Award winner.

Notable alumni
 Todd Cerney- rock and country musician, composer and producer
 Mark Dantonio - Michigan State University Head Football coach 
 Kevin Martin - Sacramento Kings, Houston Rockets, Minnesota Timberwolves
 Jay Payton - Georgia Institute of Technology, New York Mets, Colorado Rockies, San Diego Padres, Boston Red Sox, Oakland Athletics, Baltimore Orioles
 Michele Redman - LPGA Professional
 Troy Balderson - Ohio House of Representatives of District 94, January 2009- July 2011; Ohio State Senator, July 2011-August 2018; US House of Representatives of district 12.

References

External links
 District Website

High schools in Muskingum County, Ohio
Buildings and structures in Zanesville, Ohio
Public high schools in Ohio
1855 establishments in Ohio